Guanziling Hot Spring is a hot spring in Baihe District, Tainan, Taiwan.

History
The hot spring was discovered by the Japanese troops in the area and it was named Taiwan's No. 1 Hot Spring in 1920.

Geology
The hot spring is located at an altitude of 270 meters above sea level. This rare spring releases methane, which has been burning constantly for around three centuries.

See also
 Taiwanese hot springs

References

External links
 
 

Hot springs of Taiwan
Landforms of Tainan
Tourist attractions in Tainan
Persistent natural fires